948 Jucunda (provisional designation:  or ) is a background asteroid, approximately  in diameter, located in the outer region of the asteroid belt. It was discovered on 3 March 1921, by astronomer Karl Reinmuth at the Heidelberg-Königstuhl State Observatory in southwest Germany. The asteroid has a longer-than average rotation period of 26.2 hours. It was named after a common German female name, unrelated to the discoverer's contemporaries, that was taken from the almanac Lahrer Hinkender Bote.

Orbit and classification 

Jucunda is a non-family asteroid of the main belt's background population when applying the hierarchical clustering method to its proper orbital elements. It orbits the Sun in the outer asteroid belt at a distance of 2.5–3.5 AU once every 5 years and 3 months (1,928 days; semi-major axis of 3.03 AU). Its orbit has an eccentricity of 0.16 and an inclination of 9° with respect to the ecliptic. The body's observation arc begins at Heidelberg/Vienna Observatory on 10 March 1921, one week after its official discovery observation.

Naming 

This minor planet was named "Jucunda", after a female name picked from the Lahrer Hinkender Bote, published in Lahr, southern Germany. A Hinkender Bote (lit. "limping messenger") was a very popular almanac, especially in the alemannic-speaking region from the late 17th throughout the early 20th century. The calendar section contains feast days, the dates of important fairs and astronomical ephemerides. The calendar contains a German name day analogue for the respective catholic and protestant feast-days (entry not found). The name derives from iucundus, Latin for "pleasant" or "agreeable".

Reinmuth's calendar names 

As with 913 Otila, 994 Otthild, 997 Priska and 1144 Oda, Reinmuth selected names from this calendar due to his many asteroid discoveries that he had trouble thinking of proper names. These names are not related to the discoverer's contemporaries. Lutz Schmadel, the author of the Dictionary of Minor Planet Names learned about Reinmuth's source of inspiration from private communications with Dutch astronomer Ingrid van Houten-Groeneveld, who worked as a young astronomer at Heidelberg.

Physical characteristics 

Jucunda is an assumed carbonaceous C-type asteroid. However, most published albedos are between 0.13 and 0.19, too high to agree with a carbonaceous spectral type (see below).

Rotation period 

In April 2011, a rotational lightcurve of Jucunda was obtained from photometric observations by Robert Stephens at the Santana Observatory  and Goat Mountain Astronomical Research Station  in California. Lightcurve analysis gave a rotation period of  hours with a brightness amplitude of  magnitude. Observations in March 2011, by Luca Strabla, Ulisse Quadri and Roberto Girelli at Bassano Bresciano Observatory  gave a period of  hours with an amplitude of  magnitude.

Diameter and albedo 

The Collaborative Asteroid Lightcurve Link assumes a standard albedo for a carbonaceous asteroid of 0.057 and calculates a diameter of 27.90 kilometers based on an absolute magnitude of 11.5. Additional measurements were published by the WISE team (all of them have larger diameters with lower albedos).

References

External links 
 Lightcurve Database Query (LCDB), at www.minorplanet.info
 Dictionary of Minor Planet Names, Google books
 Asteroids and comets rotation curves, CdR – Geneva Observatory, Raoul Behrend
 Discovery Circumstances: Numbered Minor Planets (1)-(5000) – Minor Planet Center
 
 

000948
Discoveries by Karl Wilhelm Reinmuth
Named minor planets
19210303